The women's single event at the 2022 World Singles Ninepin Bowling Classic Championships was held in Elva, Estonia. Qualifying took place on 23-24 May, while knock-out phase from 26 May to 28 May 2022.

The defending champion is German Sina Beißer, who won this competition at 2018 World Championships in Cluj-Napoca by defeating the Hungarian Anita Méhész in the final.

Results

Starting places 
The starting places have been allocated on the basis of each nation achievements during the previous championships. The first were given on the basis of the places taken by the teams during 2021 World Championships, and the rest in reference to the competition of previous championships taken.

Qualifying 

All players will play qualification game with 120 balls. Best 32 will qualify to the knock-out phase.

Finals 
According to the results of the qualifying, 32 players will be put in bouts, which took place on standard match rules - 4 sets of 30 throws. The competitor who obtains a larger number of sets wins. With an equal number of sets decides a higher total score.

References 

2022
Women's single